Dale Allen Samuels (born August 2, 1931) is a former American football quarterback who played one season with the Chicago Cardinals of the National Football League (NFL). He was drafted by the Cardinals in the third round of the 1953 NFL Draft. He played college football at Purdue University and attended Robert Lindblom Math & Science Academy in Chicago.

College career
Samuels played for the Purdue Boilermakers from 1950 to 1952. He was the first Boilermaker to record 1,000 passing yards in a season when he threw for 1,076 yards in 1950. In his second game for the Boilermakers on October 7, 1950, he helped Purdue defeat the Notre Dame Fighting Irish and end their 39-game undefeated streak. The Boilermakers won the Big Ten co-championship his senior year in 1952. He was inducted into the Purdue Intercollegiate Athletics Hall of Fame in 2001.

Professional career
Samuels was selected by the Chicago Cardinals with the 28th pick in the 1953 NFL draft. He played in one game for the Cardinals during the 1953 season.

References

Living people
1931 births
Players of American football from Chicago
American football quarterbacks
Purdue Boilermakers football players
Chicago Cardinals players
Robert Lindblom Math & Science Academy alumni